Qədili may refer to:
 Qədili, Qubadli, Azerbaijan
 Qədili, Samukh, Azerbaijan